The Rudnici boksita Nikšić is a large mine located in the Central - Western part of Montenegro in Nikšić Municipality 55 km North - West of the capital, Podgorica. Nikšić represents the largest bauxite reserve in Montenegro and one of the largest in Europe, having estimated reserves of 135.2 million tonnes.

References 

Bauxite mines in Montenegro
Mining companies of Montenegro